The Maurice Farman MF.6 Shorthorn is a French tourism biplane developed by Maurice Farman before World War I.

Operational history
A number of MF.6 biplanes were imported to Japan on the eve of World War I.

Specifications

References

Bibliography

1910s French military reconnaissance aircraft
Biplanes
Single-engined pusher aircraft
MF.06
1910s French military trainer aircraft
Canard aircraft
Aircraft first flown in 1911